Splendor in the Grass is a  1961 American film. The phrase "splendor [or splendour] in the grass" can also refer to:

 Splendor in the Grass (1981 film), a 1981 television remake of the original film
 Splendor in the Grass (album), a 2009 album by the American musical group Pink Martini
 Splendour in the Grass, an Australian music festival

See also 
 Ode: Intimations of Immortality,  poem by William Wordsworth composed 1802–1804. A stanza from the poem is read by Natalie Wood's character in the 1961 movie.  "Though nothing can bring back the hour / Of splendour in the grass, of glory in the flower; / We will grieve not, rather find / Strength in what remains behind".